Penang International Airport  is an airport in northern Malaysia.

Penang International Airport is the third-busiest airport in Malaysia in terms of passenger traffic and the second-busiest in terms of cargo tonnage. The airport is also one of the hubs of the Malaysian low-cost carriers, AirAsia and Firefly.

History

The airport, then named Bayan Lepas International Airport, was completed in 1935, when Penang was part of the British crown colony of the Straits Settlements.

In the 1970s, a major expansion of the airport was carried out, during which a terminal building of Minangkabau architecture was built and the runway extended to accommodate Boeing 747s, then the largest passenger jet aircraft.  Upon the completion of the expansion works in 1979, the airport was renamed Penang International Airport.

In December 2019, MAHB announced a RM800 million expansion plan for the airport, with work on 4 phases starting in March 2020 and to be completed by 2024. This would raise the capacity of the airport from 6.5 million passengers yearly, to 12 million a year. This compares with actual passenger numbers of 9.5 million. However, in May 2020, Chief Minister of Penang Chow Kon Yeow says the planned expansion of the airport might well be by between six months to a year due as a result of the COVID-19.

On 5 April 2020, Chief Minister Chow Kon Yeow said that all international flights into Penang had ceased, although domestic flights continued.

Facilities

The airport became a source of contention between the Penang state government and the Malaysian federal government in recent years, as transportation infrastructure throughout Malaysia falls under the purview of the latter authority. Calls by the Penang state government to expand the airport largely went unheeded by the Malaysian federal government, even though the airport has exceeded its maximum capacity of 6.5 million passengers. In 2017, the federal authorities finally announced plans to expand the airport to accommodate 12 million passengers per year by 2029. The airport expansion was stalled from 2020-2022 due to issues with land acquisition and funding however the Malaysian Transport Ministry has reaffirmed its expansion plans.

Airlines and destinations

Passenger

Cargo

Operational statistics
Penang International Airport is the third busiest airport in the country in terms of passenger traffic after Kuala Lumpur International Airport and Kota Kinabalu International Airport, and handles the second largest cargo tonnage of all Malaysian airports after Kuala Lumpur International Airport. , the airport posted a record 7.23 million tourist arrivals.

Notably, Malaysia Airlines subsidiary, Firefly, has made Penang International Airport one of its main hubs. AirAsia, another domestic budget airliner, also operates out of Penang International Airport as one of its secondary hubs.

Ground transportation
Rapid Penang has provided four bus routes to and from Penang International Airport, connecting the airport with various parts of Penang Island.

The Rapid Penang routes that pass through the Penang International Airport include:

 102: Penang International Airport-Penang National Park-Penang International Airport
 306: Penang International Airport-Penang General Hospital-Penang International Airport
 401: Teluk Kumbar-Pengkalan Weld-Teluk Kumbar
 401E: Balik Pulau-Pengkalan Weld-Balik Pulau

In addition, as of December 2020, the state government is planning a light-rail project that will connect Penang International Airport and Komtar with 27 intermediate stations.

Incidents 
28 March 1981: Garuda Indonesia Flight 206 refueled at Penang International Airport. During refueling, the hijackers removed an old lady named Hulda Panjaitan from the plane because she kept crying. Subsequently, the plane took off and landed at Don Mueang Airport in Bangkok.
October 1985: Barlow and Chambers, two British-Australian criminals were caught at the airport, trying to smuggle heroin into Australia. Both were arrested and later sentenced to death.
9 Jan 2000: Korean Air Cargo Flight 367, a Boeing 747-230F while approaching Runway 22. The aircraft lost a flap section, which punctured the fuselage, causing a 1 m-wide hole.
1 Jan 2020: A bush fire near the airport put authorities on alert, but flights were not delayed by the incident.

References

External links

Penang International Airport at Malaysia Airports Holdings Berhad

Penang Sentral global website

Airports in Penang
Northern Corridor Economic Region
1935 establishments in British Malaya
Airports established in 1935